

Events

January 

 January 1 
 The Nurses Registration Act 1901 comes into effect in New Zealand, making it the first country in the world to require state registration of nurses. On January 10, Ellen Dougherty becomes the world's first registered nurse.
 Nathan Stubblefield demonstrates his wireless telephone device in the U.S. state of Kentucky.
 January 8 – A train collision in the New York Central Railroad's Park Avenue Tunnel kills 17 people, injures 38, and leads to increased demand for electric trains and the banning of steam locomotives in New York City.
 January 23 – Hakkōda Mountains incident: A snowstorm in the Hakkōda Mountains of northern Honshu, Japan, kills 199 during a military training exercise.
 January 30 – The Anglo-Japanese Alliance is signed.

February 

 February 11 – Police and universal suffrage demonstrators are involved in a physical altercation in Brussels, Belgium.
 February 15 – The Berlin U-Bahn underground is opened.
 February 18 – U.S. President Theodore Roosevelt prosecutes the Northern Securities Company for violation of the Sherman Act.
 February 27 – Australian officers Breaker Morant and Peter Handcock are executed for the murder of Boer prisoners of war near Louis Trichardt.

March 

 March 7 – Second Boer War: Battle of Tweebosch – South African Boers win their last battle over the British Army, with the capture of a British general and 200 of his men.
 March 8 – Jean Sibelius's Symphony No. 2 is premiered in Helsinki in the Grand Duchy of Finland.
 March 10 
 Clashes between police and Georgian workers led by Joseph Stalin leave 15 dead, 54 wounded, and 500 in prison.
 A Circuit Court decision in the United States ends Thomas Edison's monopoly on 35 mm movie film technology.

April 

 April 2 – The Electric Theatre, the first movie theater in the United States, opens in Los Angeles.
 April 11 – Tenor Enrico Caruso makes the first million-selling recording, for the Gramophone Company in Milan, Italy.
 April 19 – The 7.5  Guatemala earthquake shakes Guatemala with a maximum Mercalli intensity of VIII (Severe), killing between 800 and 2,000.

May 

 May 5 – The Commonwealth Public Service Act creates Australia's Public Service.
 May 7 – La Soufrière volcano on the Caribbean island of Saint Vincent erupts, devastating the northern portion of the island and killing 2,000 people
 May 8 – Mount Pelée in Martinique erupts, destroying the town of Saint-Pierre and killing over 30,000.
 May 13 – Alfonso XIII of Spain begins his reign.
 May 20 – Cuba gains independence from the United States.
 May 22 – The White Star Liner SS Ionic is launched by Harland and Wolff in Belfast.
 May 29 – The London School of Economics is opened by Lord Rosebery.
 May 31 – The Treaty of Vereeniging ends the Second Boer War.

June 

 June 2 – The Anthracite Coal Strike begins in the United States.
 June 13 – Minnesota Mining and Manufacturing, predecessor of global consumer goods brand 3M, begins trading as a mining venture at Two Harbors in the United States.
 June 15 – The New York Central Railroad inaugurates the 20th Century Limited passenger train between Chicago and New York City.
 June 16 – The Commonwealth Franchise Act in Australia grants women's suffrage in federal elections for resident British subjects (with certain ethnic minorities excepted), making Australia the first independent country to grant women the vote at a national level, and the first country to allow them to stand for Parliament.
 June 26 – Edward VII institutes the Order of Merit, an order bestowed personally by the British monarch on up to 24 distinguished Empire recipients.

July 

 July – James Stevenson-Hamilton is appointed warden of the Sabie Game Reserve in South Africa.
 July 2 – Philippine–American War ends.
 July 5 – Erik Gustaf Boström returns as Prime Minister of Sweden.
 July 8 – The United States Bureau of Reclamation is established within the U.S. Geological Survey.
 July 10 – The Rolling Mill Mine disaster in Johnstown, Pennsylvania, kills 112 miners.
 July 11
 Lord Salisbury retires as Prime Minister of the United Kingdom.
 The British Order of the Garter is conferred on Archduke Franz Ferdinand of Austria.
 July 14 – St Mark's Campanile in Venice collapses.
 July 21 – Fluminense Football Club is founded in Rio de Janeiro.
July 22 – Felix Pedro discovers gold in modern-day Fairbanks, Alaska.

August 

 August 1 – 100 miners die in a pit explosion in Wollongong, Australia.
 August 9 – Coronation of Edward VII as King of the United Kingdom and the British Dominions, Emperor of India at Westminster Abbey in London.
 August 22 – Theodore Roosevelt becomes the first American President to ride in an automobile, a Columbia Electric Victoria through Hartford, Connecticut.
 August 22 – A 7.7 earthquake shakes the border between China and Kyrgyzstan killing 10,000 people.
 August 24 – A statue of Joan of Arc is unveiled in Saint-Pierre-le-Moûtier, the French town which she stormed in 1429.
 August 30 – Mount Pelée again erupts in Martinique, destroying the town of Le Morne-Rouge and causing 1,000 deaths.

September 

 September 1 – The first science fiction film, the silent A Trip to the Moon (Le Voyage dans La Lune), is premièred at the Théâtre Robert-Houdin in Paris, France, by actor/producer Georges Méliès, and proves an immediate success.
 September 19 – Shiloh Baptist Church disaster: A stampede at the Shiloh Baptist Church in Birmingham, Alabama, after a talk by Booker T. Washington, kills 115.

October 

 October 16 – The first Borstal (youth offenders' institution) opens in Borstal, Kent, U.K.
 October 21 – A five-month strike by the United Mine Workers in the United States ends.

November 

 November 15
 King Leopold II of Belgium survives an attempted assassination in Brussels by Italian anarchist Gennaro Rubino.
 The Hanoi exhibition, a world's fair, opens in French Indochina.
 November 16 – A newspaper cartoon inspires creation of the first teddy bear by Morris Michtom in the United States.
 November 30 – On the American frontier, the second-in-command of Butch Cassidy's Wild Bunch, Harvey Logan ("Kid Curry"), is sentenced to 20 years hard labor.

December 

 December–February 1903 – Venezuelan crisis: Britain, Germany and Italy sustain a naval blockade on Venezuela, in order to enforce collection of outstanding financial claims. This prompts the development of the Roosevelt Corollary to the Monroe Doctrine.
 December 10 – The first Aswan Dam on the Nile is completed.
 December 17 – The Commercial Telegraph Agency (TTA, Torgovo-Telegrafnue Agenstvo), predecessor of TASS, is officially established under the Ministry of Finance at Saint Petersburg in the Russian Empire.
 December 30 – Discovery Expedition: British explorers Scott, Shackleton and Wilson reach the furthest southern point reached thus far by man, south of 82°S.

Date unknown 
 The capital of French Indochina is moved from Saigon (in Cochinchina) to Hanoi (Tonkin).
 Construction of the Paul Doumer Bridge, linking both sections of Hanoi, is completed.
 The first Korean Empire passports are issued to assist Korean immigration to Hawaii.
 The Potawatomi Zoo in South Bend, Indiana, begins life as a duck pond.
 De'Longhi home appliance brand is founded in the Veneto region of Italy.
 Daniels Linseed, predecessor of Archer Daniels Midland (ADM), a global livestock, commodities trading, food processing brand, is founded in Minnesota, United States.

Births

January 

 January 1 – Buster Nupen, South African cricketer (d. 1977)
 January 3 – Tommaso Dal Molin, Italian aviator (d. 1930)
 January 4 – John A. McCone, American politician, 6th Director of Central Intelligence (d. 1991)
 January 8 – Georgy Malenkov, Soviet politician (d. 1988)
 January 9
 Sir Rudolf Bing, Austrian-born British opera manager (d. 1997)
 Josemaría Escrivá, Spanish Roman Catholic priest and saint (d. 1975)
 Ann Nixon Cooper, African-American civil rights activist (d. 2009)
 January 11
 Maurice Duruflé, French composer (d. 1986)
 Evelyn Dove, British singer and actress (d. 1987)
 January 15
 Nâzım Hikmet, Turkish poet and director (d. 1963)
 King Saud of Saudi Arabia (d. 1969)
 January 16 – Eric Liddell, Scottish runner (d. 1945)
 January 19 – Marjorie Daw, American actress (d. 1979)
 January 20
 Kevin Barry, Irish republican (d. 1920)
 Leon Ames, American actor (d. 1993)
 January 22 – Daniel Kinsey, American hurdler (d. 1970)
 January 24 – Alan Stuart Paterson, New Zealand cartoonist (d. 1968)
 January 25
 André Beaufre, French general (d. 1975)
 Pablo Antonio, Filipino modernist architect (d. 1975)
 January 26 – Menno ter Braak, Dutch author, polemicist (d. 1940)
 January 31
 Tallulah Bankhead, American actress (d. 1968)
 Alva Myrdal, Swedish politician, diplomat, and writer, recipient of the Nobel Peace Prize (d. 1986)

February 

 February 1 – Langston Hughes, African-American writer (d. 1967)
 February 4
 Charles Lindbergh, American aviator (d. 1974)
 Hartley Shawcross, British barrister and politician (d. 2003)
 February 5 – Iwamoto Kaoru, Japanese professional Go player (d. 1999)
 February 8 – Demchugdongrub, Mongolian politician (d. 1966)
 February 9 
 Blanche Calloway, American jazz singer (d. 1978)
 Léon M'ba, 1st President of Gabon (d. 1967)
 February 10 – Walter Houser Brattain, American physicist, Nobel Prize laureate (d. 1987)
 February 11 – Arne Jacobsen, Danish architect, designer (d. 1971)
 February 12 – William Collier Jr., American actor (d. 1987)
 February 14 – Thelma Ritter, American actress (d. 1969)
 February 19 – Kay Boyle, American writer (d. 1992)
 February 20 – Ansel Adams, American photographer (d. 1984)
 February 22 – Herma Szabo, Austrian figure skater (d. 1986) 
 February 27
 Gene Sarazen, American golfer (d. 1999)
 John Steinbeck, American writer, Nobel Prize laureate (d. 1968)

March 

 March 7
 Heinz Rühmann, German actor (d. 1994)
 Ernő Schwarz, Hungarian-American soccer player (d. 1977)
 March 9 – Will Geer, American actor (d. 1978)
 March 13 – Mohammed Abdel Wahab, Egyptian singer (d. 1991)
 March 15 – Carla Porta Musa, Italian essayist, poet (d. 2012)
 March 17 – Bobby Jones, American golfer (d. 1971)
 March 19
 Fuad Chehab, 8th President of Lebanon (d. 1973)
 Louisa Ghijs, Belgian stage actress, wife of Johannes Heesters (d. 1985)
 March 21 
Al Smith, American cartoonist (d. 1986) 
Son House, American musician (d. 1988)
 March 24 – Thomas E. Dewey, American politician (d. 1971)
 March 27 – Émile Benveniste, French linguist (d. 1976)
 March 28 – Dame Flora Robson, English actress (d. 1984)
 March 29
 Marcel Aymé, French writer (d. 1967)
 William Walton, English composer (d. 1983)
 March 30 – Brooke Astor, American socialite, philanthropist (d. 2007)

April
 April 2 – Jan Tschichold, German-born typographer (d. 1974)
 April 4
 Louise Lévêque de Vilmorin, French actress (d. 1969)
 Stanley G. Weinbaum, American science-fiction author (d. 1935)
 April 8
 Andrew Irvine, British mountaineer (d. 1924)
 Josef Krips, Austrian conductor, violinist (d. 1974)
 April 12 – Louis Beel, Prime Minister of the Netherlands (d. 1977)
 April 14
 Olive Diefenbaker, second wife of Canadian Prime Minister John Diefenbaker (d. 1976)
 Yakov Smushkevich, Soviet Air Force general (d. 1941)
 April 18 – Giuseppe Pella, Prime Minister of Italy (d. 1981)
 April 20 – Sir Donald Wolfit, English actor (d. 1968)
 April 23 – Halldór Laxness, Icelandic writer, Nobel Prize laureate (d. 1998)
 April 25 – Werner Heyde, German psychiatrist (d. 1964)
 April 28 – Johan Borgen, Norwegian author (d. 1979)
 April 30 – Theodore Schultz, American economist, Nobel Prize laureate (d. 1998)

May 

 May 2 – Brian Aherne, English-born actor (d. 1986)
 May 3 – Alfred Kastler, French physicist, recipient of the Nobel Prize (d. 1984)
 May 6 – Max Ophüls, German film director (d. 1957)
 May 8 – André Michel Lwoff, French microbiologist, recipient of the Nobel Prize in Physiology or Medicine (d. 1994)
 May 10 – David O. Selznick, American film producer (d. 1965)
 May 15 – Richard J. Daley, American politician, 48th Mayor of Chicago (d. 1976)
 May 18 – Meredith Willson, American composer (d. 1984)
 May 21
 Marcel Lajos Breuer, Hungarian-born architect (d. 1981)
 Anatole Litvak, Ukrainian-born film director (d. 1974)
Leonidas Zervas, Greek organic chemist (d. 1980)
 May 22 – Al Simmons, American baseball player (d. 1956)
 May 24 – Wilbur Hatch, American music composer, musical director of Desilu Productions (d. 1969)
 May 29 – Henri Guillaumet, French aviator (d. 1940)

June 

 June 1 – C. Wade McClusky, United States Navy admiral (d. 1976)
 June 2 – James T. Berryman, American political cartoonist, recipient of the 1950 Pulitzer Prize for Editorial Cartooning (d. 1971)
 June 8 – James Stillman Rockefeller, American Olympic rower – Men's eights (d. 2004)
 June 9 – Skip James, American Delta blues singer, songwriter, and musician (d. 1969)
 June 16 – Barbara McClintock, American geneticist, recipient of the Nobel Prize in Physiology or Medicine (d. 1992)
 June 22 – Henri Deglane, French wrestler (d. 1975)
 June 24 – Juan Antonio Yanes, Venezuelan professional baseball pioneer (d. 1987)
 June 25 
 Li Ziming, Chinese martial artist (d. 1993)
 Ralph Erickson, American baseball relief pitcher (d. 2002)
 Yasuhito, Prince Chichibu, Japanese prince (d. 1953)
 June 26 – Hugues Cuénod, Swiss tenor (d. 2010)
 June 27 – Stanisław Wycech, Polish World War I veteran (d. 2008)
 June 28 – Richard Rodgers, American composer (d. 1979)
 June 29 – Ellen Pollock, British actress (d. 1997)

July 

 July 1 – William Wyler, American film director (d. 1981)
 July 4
 Vince Barnett, American actor (d. 1977)
 Meyer Lansky, Russian-born American mobster (d. 1983)
 George Murphy, American dancer, actor and politician (d. 1992)
 July 6 – Jerónimo Mihura, Spanish film director (d. 1990)
 July 7 – Ted Radcliffe, American professional baseball player (d. 2005)
 July 8
 Richard Barrett Lowe, American governor of both Guam and American Samoa (d. 1972)
 Gwendolyn Bennett, American writer (d. 1981)
 July 10
 Kurt Alder, German chemist, Nobel Prize laureate (d. 1958)
 Nicolás Guillén, Cuban poet, journalist, political activist and writer (d. 1989)
 July 12 – Tony Lovink, Dutch politician (d. 1995)
 July 16 
 Alexander Luria, Russian neuropsychologist (d. 1977)
 Andrew L. Stone, American screenwriter, director and producer (d. 1999)
 July 18 – Chill Wills, American actor, singer (d. 1978)
 July 21 
 Georges Wambst, French cyclist (d. 1988)
 Margit Manstad, Swedish actress (d. 1996)
 Joseph Kesselring, American playwright (d. 1967)
 July 28
 Albert Namatjira, Australian painter (d. 1959)
 Karl Popper, Austrian philosopher (d. 1994)
 July 31
 Gubby Allen, Australian-born English cricketer, cricket administrator (d. 1989)
 Randolph E. Haugan, American author, editor and publisher (d. 1985)

August 

 August 2 – Pope Cyril VI of Alexandria, Coptic Orthodox Patriarch (d. 1971)
 August 7 – Ann Harding, American actress (d. 1981)
 August 8 – Paul Dirac, English physicist, Nobel Prize laureate (d. 1984)
 August 9 – Zino Francescatti, French violinist (d. 1991)
 August 10 – Arne Tiselius, Swedish chemist, Nobel Prize laureate (d. 1971)
 August 11
 Alfredo Binda, Italian cyclist (d. 1986)
 Lloyd Nolan, American film, television actor (d. 1985)
 Norma Shearer, Canadian actress (d. 1983)
 August 12
 Mohammad Hatta, 1st Vice President of Indonesia (d. 1980)
 K. G. Ambegaonkar Fifth Governor of the Reserve Bank of India. (D. Unknown)
 August 13 – Felix Wankel, German mechanical engineer (d. 1988)
 August 16 – Georgette Heyer, British writer (d. 1974)
 August 18 – Adamson-Eric, Estonian artist (d. 1968)
 August 19
 Ogden Nash, American poet (d. 1971)
 J. B. L. Reyes, Filipino jurist (d. 1994)
 August 22 – Leni Riefenstahl, German film director (d. 2003)
 August 24 – Carlo Gambino, American gangster (d. 1976)
 August 25 – Stefan Wolpe, German-born composer (d. 1972)

September 

 September 2 – Peter Pitseolak, Inuit photographer, author (d. 1973)
 September 5 – Darryl F. Zanuck, American film producer and studio executive (d. 1979)
 September 6 – Sylvanus Olympio, Togolese politician, 1st President of Togo (assassinated) (d. 1963)
 September 9 – Roberto Noble, Argentine politician, journalist and publisher (d. 1969)
 September 12 – Juscelino Kubitschek, 21st President of Brazil (d. 1976)
 September 14 – Giorgos Papasideris, Greek singer, composer, and lyricist (d. 1977)
 September 21 
 Luis Cernuda, Spanish poet (d. 1963)
 Ilmari Salminen, Finnish athlete (d. 1986)
 September 22
 John Houseman, Romanian-born actor, producer (d. 1988)
 Ruhollah Khomeini, Iranian Shia cleric (d. 1989)
 September 23 – Ion Gheorghe Maurer, Romanian lawyer and politician, 49th Prime Minister of Romania (d. 2000)
 September 26 – Albert Anastasia, Italian-born American gangster (d. 1957)

October 

 October 2 – Leopold Figl, former Chancellor of Austria (d. 1965)
 October 5
 Larry Fine, American actor and comedian, better known as a member of The Three Stooges (d. 1975)
 Ray Kroc, American fast food entrepreneur, known for his ownership of the McDonald's chain (d. 1984)
 October 12 – Hiromichi Yahara, Imperial Japanese Army officer (d. 1981)
 October 18
 Miriam Hopkins, American actress (d. 1972)
 Pascual Jordan, German physicist (d. 1980)
 October 21 – Eddy Hamel, American footballer (d. 1943 in Auschwitz)
 October 25
 Carlo Gnocchi, Italian Roman Catholic priest and blessed (d. 1956)
 Eddie Lang, American jazz guitarist (d. 1933)
 October 26 – Jack Sharkey, American heavyweight boxing champion (d. 1994)
 October 28 – Elsa Lanchester, British-American actress (d. 1986)
 October 31 – Carlos Drummond de Andrade, Brazilian poet (d. 1987)

November 

 November 1 – Eugen Jochum, German conductor (d. 1987)
 November 2
 Princess Mafalda of Savoy (d. 1944)
 Prince Rostislav Alexandrovich of Russia (d. 1978)
 November 9 – Anthony Asquith, British film director (d. 1968)
 November 17 – Eugene Wigner, Hungarian physicist, Nobel Prize laureate (d. 1995)
 November 21
 Isaac Bashevis Singer, Polish-American novelist, writer and Nobel Prize laureate (d. 1991)
 Mikhail Suslov, Soviet politician (d. 1982)
 November 22 – Philippe Leclerc de Hauteclocque, French general (d. 1947)
 November 23 – Victor Jory, Canadian actor (d. 1982)
 November 27 – Marcial Lichauco, Filipino lawyer and diplomat (d. 1971)
 November 30 – Hussein ibn Nasser, 8th Prime Minister of Jordan (d. 1982)

December 

 December 1 – Trần Văn Hương, South Vietnamese politician, 3rd President of South Vietnam, 3rd Vice President of South Vietnam, and 3rd Prime Minister of South Vietnam (d. 1982)
 December 2 – Wifredo Lam, Cuban artist (d. 1982)
 December 3 – Mitsuo Fuchida, Japanese aviator, naval officer, and Christian evangelist (d. 1976)
 December 5 
 Emeric Pressburger, Hungarian-British film director (d. 1988)
 Strom Thurmond, American politician (d. 2003)
 December 9 – Margaret Hamilton, American actress (d. 1985)
 December 14 – Frances Bavier, American stage and television actress (d. 1989)
 December 19 – Ralph Richardson, English actor (d. 1983)
 December 20 – Prince George, Duke of Kent (d. 1942)
 December 23
 Norman Maclean, American author (d. 1990)
 Charan Singh, 5th Prime Minister of India (d. 1987)
 December 25 – Barton MacLane, American actor (d. 1969)
 December 27 – Francesco Agello, Italian aviator (d. 1942)
 December 28
 Mortimer Adler, American philosopher (d. 2001)
 Shen Congwen, Chinese writer (d. 1988)

Date unknown
 Nazem Akkari, 19th Prime Minister of Lebanon (d. 1985)
 Harun Babunagari, Bangladeshi Islamic scholar and educationist (d. 1986)
 Remziye Hisar, Turkish chemist (d. 1992)

Deaths

January–June 

 January 5 – Martis Karin Ersdotter, Swedish businesswoman (born 1829)
 January 11 – Johnny Briggs, English cricketer (b. 1862)
 January 30 – François Claude du Barail, French general and Minister of War (b. 1820)
 February 6 – Clémence Royer, French scholar (b. 1830)
 February 15 – Viggo Hørup, Danish politician (b. 1841)
 February 18 – Albert Bierstadt, German-born American painter (b. 1830)
 February 26 – Edward Henry Cooper, British army officer and politician (b. 1827)
 February 27
 Breaker Morant, Australian soldier (executed) (b. 1864)
 Peter Handcock, Australian soldier (executed) (b. 1869)
 March 3 – Isaäc Dignus Fransen van de Putte, 11th Prime Minister of the Netherlands (b. 1822)
 March 7 – Pud Galvin, American baseball player, MLB Hall of Famer (b. 1856)
 March 11 – Friedrich Engelhorn, German industrialist, founder of BASF (b. 1821)
 March 12 – John Peter Altgeld, American politician, 20th Governor of Illinois (b. 1847)
 March 15 – Sir Richard Temple, 1st Baronet, British colonial administrator of India (b. 1826)
 March 23 – Kálmán Tisza, Hungarian politician, former Prime Minister (b. 1830)
 March 26 – Cecil Rhodes, British imperialist (b. 1853)
 March 29 – Sir Andrew Clarke, British army officer and colonial governor (b. 1824)
 April 3 – Esther Hobart Morris, American suffragist judge (b. 1814)
 April 8 – John Wodehouse, 1st Earl of Kimberley, British politician (b. 1826)
 April 11 – Wade Hampton III, Confederate soldier and South Carolina politician (b. 1818)
 April 15 – Jules Dalou, French sculptor (b. 1838)
 April 17 – Francis, Duke of Cádiz, former king consort of Spain (b. 1822)
 April 19 – Hans von Pechmann, German chemist (b. 1850)
 April 26 – Lazarus Fuchs, German mathematician (b. 1833)
 April 28 – Sol Smith Russell, American comedian (b. 1848)
 May – Harriet Abbott Lincoln Coolidge, American philanthropist, author and reformer (b. 1849)
 May 5 – Bret Harte, American writer (b. 1836)
 May 6 
 Martha Perry Lowe, American social activist and organizer (b. 1829)
 William T. Sampson, American admiral (b. 1840)
 May 7 – Agostino Roscelli, Italian priest, founder of the Institute of Sisters of the Immaculata (b. 1818)
 May 26 – Almon Brown Strowger, American inventor (b. 1839)
 June 5 - Louis J. Weichmann, American witness to the assassination of Abraham Lincoln (b. 1842)
 June 8 – Charles Ingalls, American pioneer and father of Laura Ingalls Wilder (b. 1836)
 June 10
 Jacint Verdaguer, Catalan poet (b. 1845)
 Auguste Schmidt, German educator, activist (b. 1833)
 June 18 – Samuel Butler, British author (b. 1835)
 June 19 – King Albert of Saxony, member of the House of Wettin (b. 1828)

July–December 

 July 4 – Swami Vivekananda, Indian religious leader (b. 1863)
 July 6 – Maria Goretti, Italian Roman Catholic virgin, martyr and saint (b. 1890)
 July 16 – Henry Dunning Macleod, Scottish economist (b. 1821)
 July 18 – Saigō Jūdō, Japanese general, admiral, and politician (b. 1843) 
 July 27 – Gustave Trouvé, French electrical engineer and inventor (b. 1839)
 August 8 – James Tissot, French artist (b. 1836)
 August 31 – Mathilde Wesendonck, German poet (b. 1828)
 September 5 – Rudolf Virchow, German scientist, politician (b. 1821)
 September 6
 Sir Frederick Abel, British chemist (b. 1827)
 Hammerton Killick, Haitian admiral (b. 1856)
 Winfield Scott Stratton, American mining prospector and philanthropist (b. 1848)
 September 15 – Horace Gray, American jurist (b. 1828)
 September 18 – Thorborg Rappe, Swedish social reformer (b. 1832)
 September 19 – Masaoka Shiki, Japanese haiku poet (b. 1867)
 September 23 – John Wesley Powell, American explorer (b. 1834)
 September 26 – Levi Strauss, German-born American inventor of Levi's Jeans (b. 1829)
 September 29 
 William McGonagall, Scottish doggerel poet (b. 1825)
 Émile Zola, French author (b. 1840)
 September 30 – James Edward Jouett, American admiral (b. 1826)
 October 6 
 John Hall Gladstone, British chemist (b. 1827)
 Liu Kunyi, Chinese general (b. 1830)
 October 25 – Frank Norris, American novelist (b. 1870)
 October 26 – Elizabeth Cady Stanton, American activist (b. 1815)
 November 4 – Hale Johnson, American politician (b. 1847)
 November 17 – Hugh Price Hughes, Welsh social reformer (b. 1847)
 November 22
 Friedrich Alfred Krupp, German industrialist (b. 1854)
 Walter Reed, American army physician (b. 1851)
 December 2 – Count Richard Belcredi, former Prime minister of the Austrian Empire (b. 1823)
 December 3 
 Prudente de Morais, 3rd President of Brazil (b. 1841)
 Robert Lawson, New Zealand architect (b. 1833)
 December 4 – Charles Dow, American journalist, co-founder of Dow Jones & Company (b. 1851)
 December 5 – Johannes Wislicenus, German chemist (b. 1835)
 December 6 – Alice Freeman Palmer, American educator (b. 1855)
 December 7 – Thomas Nast, American caricaturist, cartoonist (b. 1840)
 December 11 – Mary Mathews Adams, Irish-born American philanthropist (b. 1840)
 December 14 – Julia Grant, First Lady of the United States (b. 1826)
 December 22 – Richard von Krafft-Ebing, German sexologist (b. 1840)
 December 23 – Frederick Temple, Archbishop of Canterbury (b. 1821)

Nobel Prizes 

 Physics – Hendrik Lorentz and Pieter Zeeman
 Chemistry – Emil Fischer
 Medicine – Sir Ronald Ross
 Literature – Theodor Mommsen
 Peace – Élie Ducommun and Charles Albert Gobat

References

Further reading and year books
 Colby, Frank Moore ed. he International Yearbook A Compendium Of The Worlds Progress During The Year 1902 (1903) coverage of each state online
  1902 Annual Cyclopedia (1903) online; highly detailed coverage of "Political, Military, and Ecclesiastical Affairs; Public Documents; Biography, Statistics, Commerce, Finance, Literature, Science, Agriculture, and Mechanical Industry" for 1902; massive compilation of facts and primary documents; worldwide coverage; 865pp
 Wall, Edgar G. ed. The British Empire yearbook (1903), 1276pp; covers 1902 online
 Gilbert, Martin. A History of the Twentieth Century: vol. 1 1900-1933 (1997) pp 55–68; global coverage of politics, diplomacy and warfare.